The Apache Dancer is a 1923 American silent drama film directed by Charles R. Seeling and starring George Larkin, Ollie Kirby, and Marie Newall. In 1929 it was released in Britain under the alternative title of Apache Love.

Cast
 George Larkin as Paul Beldere
 Ollie Kirby as Babette
 Marie Newall as Sylvia Holcombe
 Dorothy Wood as Harriette
 George Williams as Kenny Holcombe
 Julian Rivero as Count de Lyons

References

Bibliography
 Munden, Kenneth White. The American Film Institute Catalog of Motion Pictures Produced in the United States, Part 1. University of California Press, 1997.

External links
 

1923 films
1923 drama films
1920s English-language films
American silent feature films
Silent American drama films
American black-and-white films
Films directed by Charles R. Seeling
Films set in Paris
1920s American films